Oliver Beer may refer to:
 Oliver Beer (footballer) (born 1979), German football coach
 Oliver Beer (artist) (born 1985), British artist

See also
 Olivier Beer (born 1990), Swiss cyclist